Sworn Enemy is a 1936 American crime film directed by Edwin L. Marin, written by Wells Root, and starring Robert Young, Florence Rice, Joseph Calleia, Lewis Stone and Nat Pendleton. It was released on September 11, 1936, by Metro-Goldwyn-Mayer.

Plot

Cast 
 Robert Young as Henry 'Hank' Sherman
 Florence Rice as Margaret 'Peg' Gattle
 Joseph Calleia as Joe Emerald
 Lewis Stone as Doctor Simon 'Doc' Gattle
 Nat Pendleton as 'Steamer' Krupp
 Harvey Stephens as District Attorney Paul Scott
 Samuel S. Hinds as Eli Decker
 Edward Pawley as 'Dutch' McTurck
 John Wray as Lang
 Cy Kendall as Simmons
 Leslie Fenton as Steve Sherman
 Robert Gleckler as Hinkle

References

External links 
 
 
 
 

1936 films
1930s English-language films
American crime films
1936 crime films
Metro-Goldwyn-Mayer films
Films directed by Edwin L. Marin
American black-and-white films
Films scored by Edward Ward (composer)
1930s American films